Titmus is a surname. Notable people with the surname include:

Ariarne Titmus (born 2000), Australian swimmer
Fred Titmus (1932–2011), English footballer
Steve Titmus, Australian journalist, news presenter and communications consultant